was the pen name of Shibusawa Tatsuo, a novelist, art critic, and translator of French literature active during Shōwa period Japan. Shibusawa wrote many short stories and novels based on French literature and Japanese classics. His essays about black magic, demonology, and eroticism are also popular in Japan.

Early life
Shibusawa was born in the upper-class neighborhood of Takanawa in Tokyo. His father was a banker, and his mother was the daughter of an industrialist and politician. He was distantly related to the industrialist Shibusawa Eiichi. He was also related to composer Hisatada Otaka and critic Keijiro Okawa. While going through high school during World War II, he had the ambition to be an aeronautical engineer. However, the possibilities for a career in that field disappeared with Japan's defeat in the war, and Shibusawa received notably poor scores in the German language, which was widely used in engineering at the time. He turned his attention to study of the French language instead.

In 1950, after working as an editor at the Modern Nihon magazine under Junnosuke Yoshiyuki for two years (one of the authors he edited was Hisao Juran), Shibusawa entered the University of Tokyo's school of French literature, where he enthusiastically embraced the avant-garde movement of surrealism, which started in France after World War I. He was especially attracted to André Breton, and this led him to learn of the works of the Marquis de Sade.

Although Shibusawa did graduate from a master's course at the University of Tokyo, he had to abandon plans to become a professor because of tuberculosis, and started his career as a freelance writer instead. He relocated from Tokyo to the resort town of Kamakura, Kanagawa prefecture in 1946, due to its reputation for having a healthful climate for lung disorders, and continued to live there to his death.

After publishing his first book, a translation of Jean Cocteau's Le Grand Ecart in 1954, Shibusawa began to introduce French literature to Japanese readers through his translations. With the death of his father, he faced financial difficulties, and obtained a part-time job at the publishing company Iwanami Shoten, where he met his future wife, Sumiko Yagawa, who was also a translator and author. During this period, he also briefly flirted with politics, supporting the Japan Communist Party in an election for the mayor of Miura, Kanagawa by joining political rallies and distribution leaflets satirizing the opposing candidate.

Literary career
In 1959, Shibusawa published , a translation of de Sade's Juliette. During the trial, which is called  in Japan, Kenzaburō Ōe, Shūsaku Endō, Shōhei Ōoka and many other authors testified for the defense. However, in 1969, in an important decision, the Japanese Supreme Court ruled that Shibusawa and Ishii were guilty. He was fined 70,000 yen (slightly less than US$200 at the time); the triviality of the sum greatly outraged him, given the nine years that the trial had taken from his life.

Shibusawa, although discouraged, was not deterred, and continued to write works on eroticism and to translate the works of de Sade, as well as other French authors; he also produced essays and art criticism, and became a specialist in the study of medieval demonology.

In September 1970, Shibusawa made his first overseas trip, a vacation to Europe. He was seen off at Haneda Airport by his close friend Yukio Mishima. Madame de Sade by Mishima (1965) is entirely based on Shibusawa's ; but on the other hand, today it is known that Shibusawa himself plagiarized his own work largely from Vie du Marquis de Sade by Gilbert Lely (1961). In The Temple of Dawn (1969), Mishima created the character Yasushi Imanishi based on Shibusawa's personality. When Mishima died, Shibusawa wrote the obituary.

Introduced by Mishima in his late twenties, he met Tatsumi Hijikata, the founder of Butoh. He frequented Hijikata's stage performances and when Hijikata died suddenly in 1986, he served as the chairman of the funeral committee.

In 1965, he wrote an introduction to Hans Bellmer's ball-jointed doll in the magazine "New Lady". The doll artist Shimon Yotsuya was shocked to read this article and began making ball-jointed dolls. In other words, it can be said that Shibusawa created one of the triggers for the rise of ball-jointed dolls in modern Japan.

In 1981, he published a fantasy novel titled Karakusa Monogatari ("Karakusa Story"). Other fantasy novels include  and Takaoka Shinnō Kōkai-ki ("The Travels of Prince Takaoka").

Shibusawa died of a rupture of a carotid aneurysm while  he was hospitalized for larynx cancer in 1987. His grave is at the temple of Jochi-ji in Kamakura.

Major works

See also
Japanese literature
List of Japanese authors

References
Buruma, Ian. The Missionary and the Libertine: Love and War in East and West. Vintage Press (2001). .
Iwaya, Kunio. Shibusawa Tatsuhiko ko. Kawade Shobo Shinsha; Shohan edition (1990). . (Japanese)
Rimer, J. Thomas. The Columbia Anthology of Modern Japanese Literature: From 1945 to the Present. Columbia University Press (2007) 
Sas, Miryam. Fault Lines: Cultural Memory and Japanese Surrealism. Stanford University Press (2001). .

External links
Tatsuhiko Shibusawa's grave

1928 births
1987 deaths
20th-century Japanese novelists
Japanese literary critics
Japanese translators
French–Japanese translators
Japanese essayists
Japanese male short story writers
Japanese fantasy writers
People from Tokyo
University of Tokyo alumni
Deaths from cancer in Japan
Deaths from laryngeal cancer
20th-century translators
20th-century Japanese short story writers
20th-century essayists
20th-century Japanese male writers